John Alexander Jacobs (born March 18, 1945) is an American professional golfer who played on the PGA Tour and currently plays on the Champions Tour. Jacobs is the younger brother of professional golfer Tommy Jacobs.

Jacobs was born in Los Angeles, California. He turned professional in 1967. He played on the PGA Tour from 1968–1977. He never won an official PGA Tour event; his best showings were three 2nd-place finishes. He also played in Asia for many years, having considerable success on the Asia Golf Circuit, where he won the Taiwan Open twice and was the first American to top the tour's Order of Merit in 1984.

After reaching the age of 50 in 1995, Jacobs began play on the Champions Tour. His accomplishments as a senior include a major championship and more than 70 top-10 finishes.

Professional wins (12)

Japan Golf Tour wins (1)

1Co-sanctioned by the Asia Golf Circuit

Asia Golf Circuit wins (3)
1984 Taiwan Open, Dunlop International Open (also a Japan Golf Tour event)
1991 Taiwan Open

Other wins (3)
1978 Waterloo Open Golf Classic
1980 Shrine Pro-Am (Canada)
1986 Rolex Masters (Singapore)

Champions Tour wins (5)

*Note: The 2002 Royal Caribbean Classic was shortened to 36 holes due to rain.

Champions Tour playoff record (1–2)

Other senior wins (1)
1995 Senior Series Gulfport Open

Playoff record
PGA Tour playoff record (0–1)

Senior major championships

Wins (1)

See also 

 Spring 1968 PGA Tour Qualifying School graduates
Fall 1980 PGA Tour Qualifying School graduates

References

External links

American male golfers
USC Trojans men's golfers
PGA Tour golfers
PGA Tour Champions golfers
Winners of senior major golf championships
Golfers from Los Angeles
Golfers from Scottsdale, Arizona
1945 births
Living people